Hichame Alaouié is a Belgian cinematographer. His credits include Private Lessons (2008), Horses of God (2012), and Tokyo Fiancée (2014). He received the Magritte Award for Best Cinematography in two consecutive years for his work in Last Winter and Horses of God.

Filmography

References

External links

Living people
Belgian cinematographers
Year of birth missing (living people)
Magritte Award winners